NBL1 is a semi-professional basketball league in Australia, consisting of South, North, Central, West and East Conferences with both men's and women's competitions. Each conference is run by their respective state governing body, with the league including 76 clubs from across every state and territory.

In 2019, Basketball Victoria partnered with the National Basketball League (NBL) to create a new league to replace the South East Australian Basketball League (SEABL), Australia's pre-eminent semi-professional basketball league between 1981 and 2018. Following the NBL1's inaugural season in 2019, the 2020 season saw the 2019 teams comprise the new South Conference and the former Queensland Basketball League (QBL) and South Australian Premier League become the new North and Central Conferences. The league was joined by the teams from the former WA State Basketball League (SBL) in 2021 and then the teams from the former NSW Waratah League in 2022.

History

The building blocks
In October 2018, following the demise of the South East Australian Basketball League (SEABL), Basketball Victoria announced a new senior elite league to take the reins as Australia's pre-eminent semi-professional basketball league. All Victorian-based SEABL teams joined the new league, while Eltham Wildcats, Knox Raiders, Ringwood Hawks and Waverley Falcons also joined the league from the Big V State Championship Division. The North-West Tasmania Thunder men and Launceston Tornadoes women also kept their place, as did Basketball Australia's Centre of Excellence teams. In February 2019, the league was named NBL1.

Expansion
After a successful first season, the league announced in October 2019 that it would be expanding into Queensland for the 2020 season. In January 2020, NBL1 expanded with the establishment of North and South conferences for the 2020 season. After a landmark agreement with Basketball Queensland, NBL1 North replaced the Queensland Basketball League (QBL). As a result, the 2019 NBL1 teams formed the new south conference. The following month, NBL1 expanded into South Australia after an identical agreement with Basketball South Australia for NBL1 Central to replace the Premier League. However, the threat of the COVID-19 pandemic forced the 2020 season to be cancelled.

In October 2020, NBL1 expanded into Western Australia for the 2021 season after an agreement with Basketball Western Australia for NBL1 West to replace the State Basketball League. In March 2021, an agreement was reached for the Waratah League in New South Wales to become NBL1 East in 2022.

Conferences

South Conference 

Founded in 2019, the South Conference was the only conference in NBL1 during its inaugural season and predominantly consisted of teams from the defunct South East Australian Basketball League (SEABL). The South Conference currently has 20 clubs spread across Victoria, Tasmania, New South Wales and South Australia.

North Conference 

In 2020, the North Conference joined the league, becoming the second conference introduced following NBL1's merger with the former Queensland Basketball League (QBL). The North Conference currently consists of 16 clubs, with 15 based in Queensland and one based in the Northern Territory.

Central Conference 

In 2020, the Central Conference joined the league, becoming the third conference introduced following NBL1's merger with the former South Australian Premier League. The Central Conference currently consists of 10 clubs, all of which are based in South Australia.

West Conference 

In 2021, the West Conference joined the league, becoming the fourth conference introduced following NBL1's merger with the former Western Australian State Basketball League. The West Conference currently consists of 14 clubs, all of which are based in Western Australia.

East Conference 

In 2022, the East Conference joined the league, becoming the fifth conference introduced following NBL1's agreement with the Waratah League in New South Wales. The East Conference currently consists of 16 clubs, with 14 based in New South Wales and two based in the Australian Capital Territory.

Current clubs

Spread across the four conferences, a total of 72 clubs compete in the league.
South Conference: 20 clubs (includes 19 female teams and 19 male teams)
North Conference: 16 clubs
Central Conference: 10 clubs
West Conference: 14 clubs
East Conference: 16 clubs

List of Champions

References

External links

 
Basketball leagues in Australia
2019 establishments in Australia
Sports leagues established in 2019
National Basketball League (Australia)
Professional sports leagues in Australia